Crocus beydaglarensis is a species of flowering plant growing from a corm, native to southwestern Turkey.

References

beydaglarensis
Flora of Turkey